Kebila is a town and commune in the Cercle of Kolondieba in the Sikasso Region of southern Mali. In 1998 the commune had a population of 23,580.

References

Communes of Sikasso Region